Christopher Allen Nelson is an American make-up artist, VFX artist, writer and actor. He is best known for his makeup and stylings for films such as Halloween, Halloween Kills, Halloween Ends, Kill Bill: Vol. 1, Pirates of the Caribbean: The Curse of the Black Pearl, Kill Bill: Vol. 2, Sin City, Thor: The Dark World, The Amazing Spider-Man, World War Z, Inherent Vice, Deadpool, Guardians of the Galaxy Vol. 2 and Suicide Squad (2016) has earned him numerous awards and nominations. He also played the groom of Beatrix "Black Mamba" Kiddo in Kill Bill: Volume 2 and the cop with brownies in Halloween.

He won two consecutive Primetime Emmy Award for Outstanding Makeup for a Limited Series or a Movie (Non-Prosthetic) and Outstanding Prosthetic Makeup for a Series, Limited Series, Movie or a Special for American Horror Story: Freak Show,  and for Suicide Squad, he received an Academy Award for Best Makeup and Hairstyling at 89th Academy Awards.

Awards and nominations

 2014-15: Primetime Emmy Award for Outstanding Makeup for a Limited Series or a Movie (Non-Prosthetic) and Outstanding Prosthetic Makeup for a Series, Limited Series, Movie or a Special - American Horror Story: Freak Show
 2016: Academy Award for Best Makeup and Hairstyling - Suicide Squad with Alessandro Bertolazzi and Giorgio Gregorini.

References

External links
 

Living people
American male actors
Special effects people
American make-up artists
Best Makeup Academy Award winners
Place of birth missing (living people)
Year of birth missing (living people)